Massacre Bay is a bay in the U.S. state of Washington.

Massacre Bay was named for the fact that Indian massacres occurred in the area.

References

Bodies of water of San Juan County, Washington
Bays of Washington (state)